Feelin' Sorry...For All The Hearts We've Broken was the first album that Jeffries Fan Club released. A music video was made for the song "Milk".

Track listing
 "Goodbye Theme" – 4:11
 "Milk" – 3:18
 "Wish You Weren't Here" – 2:12
 "Waste Of Time" – 3:20
 "Another Love Story" – 2:53
 "I Must Be Stupid" – 4:25
 "Dream Girl" – 2:49
 "I Want More" – 4:33
 "Walking On Sunshine" – 3:20
 Katrina and the Waves cover
 "12" – 2:56

Personnel
Chris Colonnier - Trombone
Derek Gibbs - Bass guitar
Mike Dziurgot - Vocals & guitar
Justin Ferreira - drums
Chris Rush - Trumpet
Sonnie Johnston - Guitar

1997 albums
Jeffries Fan Club albums